White Music (also known as White Music Record) is a Thai record label and a subsidiary of GMM Grammy that focuses on pop music genre. The label's current acts include Palitchoke Ayanaputra (Peck),  (Pop),  (Atom) and Getsunova. Its current managing director is Rattakorn Noiprasit.

Roster

Current acts 
  (Pop)
 
 Supol Phuasirirak (Bell)
 Muzu
 
 Getsunova
 
  (Mint)
 Praput Pimpama (Opor)
 Palitchoke Ayanaputra (Peck)
  (Praw)
 Sin Singular of Singular
 Yanin Phanthai (Ai)
 Deun Chongmankhong
 Pophatson Han (Weiwei)
  (MeYou)

Former acts 
 Thongchai McIntyre (Bird)
 
 Marsha Vadhanapanich
 Palmy
 Ronnadet Wongsaroj (Namm)
  (Be)
  (Earth)
 Jannine Weigel (Ploychompoo)
  (Ammy)
  (Oat)

Concerts

References

External links 

GMM Grammy
Thai record labels
Pop record labels